The 2002 LEN European Championships were held in Berlin, Germany from Monday 29 July to Sunday 4 August 2002 at the Berlin Eurosportpark in the German capital. The 26th edition of the event was organised by the LEN. A total number of 786 swimmers competed, from 38 countries. The event included disciplines of swimming (long course), open water swimming, diving, and synchronized swimming (women). A 10 km open water event, for both men and women was introduced in the open water swimming competition, this was held in Potsdam.

Medal table

Swimming

Men's events

Women's events

Open water swimming

Men's events

Women's events

Diving

Men's events

Women's events

Synchronized swimming

External links
Results
 Swim Rankings Results

E
S
LEN European Aquatics Championships
E
European Aquatics
2002 in Berlin
July 2002 sports events in Europe
August 2002 sports events in Europe